The 1934 St. Louis Cardinals season was the team's 53rd season in St. Louis, Missouri and the 43rd season in the National League. The Cardinals went 95–58 during the season and finished first in the National League. St. Louis won 18 of their last 23 games to overtake the New York Giants the last two days of the season. In the World Series, they defeated the Detroit Tigers in seven games, winning the last 11–0.

Offseason 
 December 15, 1933: Ray Pepper was purchased from the Cardinals by the St. Louis Browns.

Regular season
Pitcher Dizzy Dean won the MVP Award this year, with 30 wins, 195 strikeouts, and a 2.66 ERA. He was also named the Associated Press Athlete of the Year.

The Gashouse Gang
The Gashouse Gang was a nickname applied to the Cardinals team of 1934. The Cardinals, by most accounts, earned this nickname from the team's generally very shabby appearance and rough-and-tumble tactics. An opponent once stated that the Cardinals players usually went into the field in unwashed, dirty, and smelly uniforms, which alone spread horror among their rivals.

According to one account, scrappy shortstop Leo Durocher coined the term. He and his teammates were speaking derisively of the American League, and the consensus was that the Redbirds – should they prevail in the National League race – would handle whoever won the AL pennant. "Why, they wouldn't even let us in that league over there", Durocher, who had played for the New York Yankees, observed. "They think we're just a bunch of gashousers." The phrase "gas house" referred to plants that manufactured town gas for lighting and cooking from coal, which were common fixtures in US cities prior to the widespread use of natural gas. The plants were noted for their foul smell and were typically located near railroad yards in the poorest neighborhood in the city.

Led by playing manager Frankie Frisch and the hard-nosed Durocher, as well as stars like Joe Medwick, Ripper Collins, Pepper Martin, Bill DeLancey and brothers Dizzy and Paul Dean, the '34 Cardinals won 95 games, the NL pennant, and the World Series in seven games over the Detroit Tigers.

The team featured five regulars who hit at least .300, a 30-game winner in Dizzy Dean (the last National League pitcher to win 30 games in a single season, and the last pitcher in Major League Baseball to do so until Denny McLain accomplished the feat for the 1968 Detroit Tigers), and four All-Stars, including player-manager Frisch. Not among the All-Stars was Collins, the first baseman who led the team in 16 offensive categories, with stats like a .333 batting average, a .615 slugging percentage, 35 home runs, and 128 runs batted in.

Season standings

Record vs. opponents

Notable transactions
 May 4, 1934: Francis Healy was purchased by the Cardinals from the New York Giants.

Roster

Player stats

Batting

Starters by position
Note: Pos = Position; G = Games played; AB = At bats; H = Hits; Avg. = Batting average; HR = Home runs; RBI = Runs batted in

Other batters
Note: G = Games played; AB = At bats; H = Hits; Avg. = Batting average; HR = Home runs; RBI = Runs batted in

Pitching

Starting pitchers
Note: G = Games pitched; IP = Innings pitched; W = Wins; L = Losses; ERA = Earned run average; SO = Strikeouts

Other pitchers
Note: G = Games pitched; IP = Innings pitched; W = Wins; L = Losses; ERA = Earned run average; SO = Strikeouts

Relief pitchers
Note: G = Games pitched; W = Wins; L = Losses; SV = Saves; ERA = Earned run average; SO = Strikeouts

1934 World Series 

In the World Series, the Cards and Tigers split the first two games in Detroit, and the Tigers took two of the next three in St. Louis. St. Louis proceeded to win the next two, including an 11–0 embarrassment of the Tigers in Detroit to win the Series. The stars for the Cardinals were Medwick, who had a .379 batting average with one of St. Louis' two home runs and a series-high five RBI, and the Dean brothers, who combined for all four of the teams wins with 28 strikeouts and a minuscule 1.43 earned run average.

NL St. Louis Cardinals (4) vs. AL Detroit Tigers (3)

League leaders
Ripper Collins
 #1 in NL in home runs (35)
 #1 in NL in slugging percentage (.615)
 #2 in NL in runs batted in (128)
 #3 in NL in hits (200)
 #3 in NL in runs scored (116)

Dizzy Dean
 #1 in MLB in wins (30)
 #1 in MLB in strikeouts (195)
 #1 in MLB in shutouts (7)
 #2 in NL in earned run average (2.66)

Paul Dean
 #2 in NL in shutouts (5)
 #3 in NL in strikeouts (150)

Pepper Martin
 #1 in NL in stolen bases (23)

Farm system

References

External links
1934 St. Louis Cardinals team page at Baseball-Reference.com
1934 St. Louis Cardinals team page at Baseball-Almanac.com

St. Louis Cardinals seasons
Saint Louis Cardinals season
National League champion seasons
World Series champion seasons
St Louis Cardinals